Liam Kapeikis (born June 28, 2004) is an American figure skater. He is the 2020 U.S. national junior bronze medalist.

Personal life 

Liam Kapeikis was born on June 28, 2004, in Wenatchee, Washington to parents, Louise and Paul. Kapeikis has two sisters, Kaela and Danika. His parents and sister, Kaela, have skated with Disney on Ice.

Kapeikis holds citizenship for the United States, Canada, and Great Britain.

Career

Early career 
Kapeikis began figure skating at the age of seven. His parents coached him in Wenatchee, Washington until the age of fifteen when he relocated to Richmond, British Columbia to be coached by former Canadian figure skater Keegan Murphy.

2019–2020 season 
Competing on the 2019–20 ISU Junior Grand Prix, he placed eleventh at 2019 JGP Latvia. In January, he won the junior bronze medal at the 2020 U.S. Championships.
Kapeikis was later assigned to compete at the 2020 Winter Youth Olympic Games in Lausanne, Switzerland, where he placed 10th.

2020–2021 season 
Kapeikis finished ninth at the 2021 U.S. junior Championships.

2021–2022 season 
Kapeikis started the season at the Skating Club of Boston's Cranberry Cup, where he finished fifth place at the junior level.
In January 2022, he finished seventh at the U.S. national championships, placing eighth in the short program and sixth in the free skate.  After attending the US junior camp, he was named to the US team for the 2022 World Junior Championships. At the 2022 World Junior Championships, Kapeikis placed fourth in the short program with a clean skate but placed twelfth in the free skate with several jump errors. As a result, he dropped to eighth place overall.

Making his senior international debut, he took the bronze medal at the Egna Spring Trophy in April.

2022–2023 season  
After winning gold at the Philadelphia Summer International, Kapeikis made his Challenger debut at the 2022 CS Nebelhorn Trophy, finishing eighth. Kapeikis then went on to make his senior Grand Prix debut at 2022 Skate America, where he placed 7th after finishing 8th in both the short program and free skate segments.

Programs

Competitive highlights
GP: Grand Prix; JGP: Junior Grand Prix

Detailed results 
ISU Personal best in bold.

Senior results

Junior results

References

External links 
 

2004 births
Living people
American male single skaters
Figure skaters at the 2020 Winter Youth Olympics